The Belgian Bishops' Conference or the Episcopal Conference of Belgium is the permanent organ of the Roman Catholic bishops in Belgium. It is a member of the Council of European Bishops' Conferences. It includes the bishops, auxiliary bishops and retired bishops of the ecclesiastical province of Belgium.

Bureau
The chairman is the archbishop of Mechelen-Brussels, Jozef De Kesel. The Secretary-General is Herman Cosijns.

Members of the Belgian Bishops' Conference

Bishops
 Jozef De Kesel, archbishop of Mechelen-Brussel
 Johan Bonny, bishop of Antwerp
 Lodewijk Aerts, bishop of Bruges
 Jean-Pierre Delville, bishop of Liège
 Guy Harpigny, bishop of Tournai
 Patrick Hoogmartens, bishop of Hasselt
 Rémy Vancottem, bishop of Namur
 Lucas Van Looy, bishop of Ghent

Auxiliary bishops 
 Pierre Warin, auxiliary bishop of Namur
 Jean Kockerols, auxiliary bishop of Mechelen-Brussel
 Jean-Luc Hudsyn, auxiliary bishop of Mechelen-Brussel
 Léon Lemmens, auxiliary bishop of Mechelen-Brussel

Emeriti
 Godfried Danneels, cardinal, archbishop emeritus of Mechelen-Brussel
 André-Joseph Léonard, archbishop emeritus of Mechelen-Brussel
 Albert Houssiau, bishop emeritus of Liège
 Aloys Jousten, bishop emeritus of Liège
 Arthur Luysterman, bishop emeritus of Ghent
 Paul Van den Berghe, bishop emeritus of Antwerp
 Jan De Bie, auxiliary bishop emeritus of Mechelen-Brussel

Operation

Within the Belgian Bishops' Conference, there are four standing committees and three Episcopal bishops committee. Each of them stands in front of a bishop to be elected as members of two or three bishops, as other members of the clergy and experts can be included. Furthermore, the bishops' conference has a coordination committee. In his work on the commissions and committees are prepared to be further discussed and inter-diocesan projects. This committee is chaired by the chairman of the Bishops' Conference.

Commissions and committees

 Commission on Faith and Church
 Commission on Evangelism
 Commission for the Diocese
 Commission "Gaudium et Spes"
 Committee for Media
 Committee for administrative, legal and financial issues
 Committee for Contacts with the public institutions and local governments

References

External links
 bisschoppenconferentie on Kerknet
 Le conference des évêques on Cathobel

Belgium
Catholic Church in Belgium